Events in the year 1024 in Norway.

Incumbents
Monarch - Olaf II Haraldsson

Events
After gaining control over Norway in 1016, Olaf II Haraldsson constructed a religious code which established the Church of Norway. It is considered to represent Norway's first national legislation

Arts and literature

Births
Magnus I of Norway (d. 1047), king of Norway (1035-47) and Denmark (1042-47), son of Olaf II Haraldsson.

Deaths

References

1024 in Europe